Brickfield Rangers F.C. is a Welsh football club based in Wrexham. They play in the Ardal Leagues North West, which is in the third tier of the Welsh football league system.

History
The club joined Welsh National League (Wrexham Area) in 1994, and since 2000 they have been playing in the Premier Division. In 2007–08, they finished bottom of the table, but avoided relegation due to internal league re-organisation. In the 2009–10 season, they finished 12th.

Brickfield Rangers has had a range of notable players come through its youth ranking system names like Robbie Savage, Jim and Jeff Whitley, David Hooson, Andrew Ruscoe, Gareth Evans Aeron Edwards,

Staff 
 Chairman:  Paul Hooson
 Director Of Football:  Dave Norman
 Vice-chairman:  Tony Williams
 First Team Manager:  Gareth Wilson
 1st Team Coach:  Paul Dodds
 Secretary:  John Nuthall 
 Disability Manager:  Del Williams

Honours
Welsh National League (Wrexham Area) Premier Division
Runners-Up : 2017, 2018

Welsh National League (Wrexham Area) Division One
Runners-Up : 2000
Third : 1998, 1999

References

External links
Official website
Welsh National League website

Welsh National League (Wrexham Area) Premier Division clubs
Football clubs in Wrexham
Association football clubs established in 1976
1976 establishments in Wales
Ardal Leagues clubs